Oxford Street, a main shopping street in Central London, has been decorated with festive lights for many Christmases since 1959. They have been a regular and popular feature of Christmas in London.

The lights were originally installed in response to nearby Regent Street, which had featured Christmas lights since 1954. The lights were paid for by shop owners and the local council, and were installed in order to give a sense of occasion to shoppers that could not be found anywhere else. The tradition fell out of favour by the early 1970s because of the economic climate, and no lights were featured for some years. It returned in the 1980s following campaigning from local traders.

Since 2010, management of the lights has been undertaken by Field and Lawn, a marquee hire company who also install the Regent Street lights. Around 750,000 bulbs are used annually. Current practice involves a celebrity turning the lights on in mid- to late-November, and the lights remain until 6 January (Twelfth Night). The position of turning the lights on can be considered an aspiration, and an indication that a particular celebrity is very popular. The festivities were postponed in 1963 because of the assassination of John F. Kennedy. In 2015, the lights were switched on earlier, on Sunday 1 November, resulting in an unusual closure of the street to all traffic. In 2018, there wasn't a celebrity guest at the light switch on and instead several performers played at various stores along the street.

The following celebrities have turned on the lights since 1981:

1980s
1981 — Pilín León (Miss World, Venezuela)
1982 — Daley Thompson
1983 — Pat Phoenix
1984 — Esther Rantzen
1985 — Bob Geldof
1986 — Leslie Grantham, Anita Dobson
1987 — Derek Jameson
1988 — Terry Wogan
1989 — Gorden Kaye

1990s
1990 — Cliff Richard
1991 — Westminster Children's Hospital
1992 — Linford Christie
1993 — Richard Branson
1994 — Lenny Henry
1995 — Coronation Street cast
1996 — Spice Girls
1997 — Peter Andre
1998 — Zoë Ball
1999 — Ronan Keating

2000s

2000 — Charlotte Church
2001 — S Club 7
2002 — Blue
2003 — Enrique Iglesias
2004 — Emma Watson, Il Divo, Steve Redgrave
2005 — Westlife
2006 — All Saints
2007 — Leona Lewis
2008 — Sugababes
2009 — Jim Carrey

2010s

2010 —  Children from Kids Company
2011 — The Saturdays
2012 — Robbie Williams
2013 — Jessie J
2014 — Cheryl Fernandez-Versini
2015 — Kylie Minogue
2016 — Craig David
2017 — Rita Ora, Vick Hope & Roman Kemp
2018 — N/A

2020 - Mia & Amalia Corsi
2020 - Gareth Eighteen

References
Citations

Sources

Oxford Street
Christmas events and celebrations